Thomas Stuart Pirie (9 December 1896 – 14 May 1963) was a Scottish amateur football wing half who appeared in the Scottish League for Queen's Park and Aberdeen. He also played in the Football League for Bristol Rovers and Cardiff City.

Career statistics

References

1896 births
Scottish footballers
Scottish Football League players
Association football wing halves
Queen's Park F.C. players
1963 deaths
Bathgate F.C. players
Aberdeen F.C. players
Cardiff City F.C. players
Bristol Rovers F.C. players
English Football League players
Footballers from Glasgow
Ross County F.C. players
People from Gorbals
Highland Football League players